"Run It Back!" is a song by American rappers Craig Xen and XXXTentacion. The song was released as a single for Craig Xen's 2019 EP Broken Kids Club. It was produced by DJ Patt and STAIN.

Background 
"Run It Back!" was first previewed in November 2017. Craig Xen described the track and part of XXXTentacion's "half-blonde era" when X had his previous split dye hairstyle in late 2016 to early 2017. The song was leaked online on May 26, 2019 and was released officially as a single on June 11, 2019. Billboard described the single as a screamo track.

Personnel 
Credits adapted from Genius.

 XXXTentacion – artist, songwriter
 Craig Xen – artist, songwriter
 DJ Patt – producer
 STAIN – producer

External links

References 

2019 singles
2019 songs
XXXTentacion songs
Songs written by XXXTentacion
Empire Distribution singles

Songs released posthumously
Screamo songs
Hardcore hip hop songs